734 Communication Squadron is a reserve military unit in Regina, Saskatchewan, Canada. The unit's motto is "Regina Camporum".

Role 
The primary role of 734 Comm Sqn is to augment the Regular Force for both domestic and international operations, including those with the UN and NATO.   International deployments include most recently Afghanistan, Bosnia and the Golan Heights. Members of the unit have also served on PMO taskings.

Composition 
734 Communication Squadron is composed mainly of Linemen, Sig Ops, and Signal Officers as well as support trades - Supply Technicians, Mobile Support Equipment Operators, Resource Management Support Clerks and Vehicle Technicians.

Military communications squadrons of Canada
Organizations based in Regina, Saskatchewan